The Council of Ministers is the executive branch of the Cypriot government, consisting of ministers. The council is chaired by the President of Cyprus and the ministers head executive departments of the government. The President and his ministers administer the government and the various public services.

Current Council

The Christodoulides government is the government of Cyprus, forming the Council of Ministers. Sworn in on 1 March 2023, it consists of members from various political parties and independent technocrats.

Council of Ministers

References

 
National cabinets